Third-Worldism is a political concept and ideology that emerged in the late 1940s or early 1950s during the Cold War and tried to generate unity among the nations that did not want to take sides between the United States and the Soviet Union. The concept is closely related but not identical to the political theory of Maoism–Third Worldism.

Overview
The political thinkers and leaders of Third-Worldism argued that the North-South divisions and conflicts were of primary political importance compared to the East-West opposition of the Cold War period. In the three-world model, the countries of the First World were the ones allied to the United States. These nations had less political risk, better functioning democracy and economic stability, and continue to have a higher standard of living. The Second World designation referred to the former industrial socialist states under the influence of the Soviet Union. The Third World hence defined countries that remained non-aligned with either NATO, or the Communist Bloc. The Third World was normally seen to include many countries with colonial pasts in Africa, Latin America, Oceania and Asia. It was also sometimes taken as synonymous with countries in the Non-Aligned Movement, connected to the world economic division as "periphery" countries in the world system that is dominated by the "core" countries.

Third-Worldism was connected to new political movements following the decolonization and new forms of regionalism that emerged in the erstwhile colonies of Asia, Africa, and the Middle-East as well as in the older nation-states of Latin America, including pan-Arabism, pan-Africanism, pan-Americanism and pan-Asianism.

The first period of the Third-World movement, that of the "first Bandung Era", was led by the Egyptian, Indonesian and Indian heads of states such as Nasser, Sukarno and Nehru. They were followed in the 1960s and 1970s by a second generation of Third-Worldist governments that emphasized on a more radical and revolutionary socialist vision, personified by the figure of Che Guevara. At the end of the Cold War in the late 1980s, Third Worldism began to enter into a period of decline.

Leaders and theorists 
Several leaders have been associated with the Third-Worldism movement, including:
  Zulfikar Ali Bhutto
  Houari Boumédiène
  Amílcar and Luís Cabral
  Fidel Castro and Che Guevara
  Hugo Chávez
  Muammar Gaddafi
  Ho Chi Minh
  Mao Zedong
  Patrice Lumumba
  Michael Manley
  Evo Morales
  Gamal Abdel Nasser
  Jawaharlal Nehru
  Kwame Nkrumah
  Julius Nyerere
  Sukarno
  Mohammad Hatta
  Thomas Sankara
  Josip Broz Tito
  Modibo Keïta

Theorists include:
 Samir Amin
 Arghiri Emmanuel
 Frantz Fanon
 Jean-Paul Sartre

See also 
 Maoism–Third Worldism
 Non-Aligned Movement
 Third World socialism
 Three Worlds Theory
 Neutral and Non-Aligned European States

References

Further reading 
 Bangura, Abdul Karim, "Toward a Pan-Third Worldism: A Challenge to the Association of Third World Studies (Journal of Third World Studies, Spring 2003)
 Hadiz, Vedi R., The Rise of Neo-Third Worldism?: The Indonesian Trajectory and the Consolidation of Illiberal Democracy, 
 Lopes Junior, Gutemberg Pacheco, The Sino-Brazilian Principles in a Latin American and BRICS Context: The Case for Comparative Public Budgeting Legal Research Wisconsin International Law Journal, 13 May 2015
 Malley, Robert, The Call From Algeria: Third Worldism, Revolution, and the Turn to Islam (UC Press)
 Malley, Robert, "The Third Worldist Moment", in Current History (November 1999)
 Slobodian, Quinn, Foreign Front: Third World Politics in Sixties West Germany'' (Duke University Press)
 Third Worldism or Socialism?, by Solidarity UK

 
Imperialism studies
Political terminology